Oswaldtwistle is a village in Hyndburn, Lancashire, England. It contains 15 buildings which are designated by Historic England and recorded in the National Heritage List for England.  Of these, one is listed at Grade II*, the middle grade, and the others are at Grade II.  Until the arrival of industry, the area was rural, and the most of the earliest listed building are, or originated as farmhouses. One building does retain a former loomshop, an example of domestic industry. The Leeds and Liverpool Canal and the former East Lancashire Railway pass through the area, and the listed buildings associated with these are two canal bridges and a railway viaduct. The remaining listed buildings are a church and a war memorial.

Key

Buildings

References

Citations

Sources

 
 
 
 
 
 
 
 
 
 
 
 
 
 
 
 
 

Lists of listed buildings in Lancashire
Buildings and structures in Hyndburn